Saeed Rashid, PP, (20 January 1927 – 19 June 1999) was a writer, teacher, and historian from Pakistan.

Life

Military College Jhelum years 
In the 1950s he was associated with the Fine Arts Cultural Center. There he wrote and produced plays. From 1950, for several years he was associated with the editorship of the college magazine Tarbiyat (training). From 1965 to 1968 he was the library officer. From 1967 to 1985 he served as the House Master for Shair Shah House. In October 1974, he was appointed Director of the Research and Development Cell and in 1991 he became secretary of the Alamgirians Society.

Major works 

Books in Urdu
Hayat-e-Quaid-e-Azam
Guftar-o-Kiradar-e-Quaid-e-Azam
Guftar-o-Kirdar-e-Sir Syed
Tazkara-e-Iqbal
Mukalmat-e-Iqbal
Shad-Bad-Manzil-e-Murad
Kirdar-ki-Kirnain
Kirdar Saz, biography of Brig. Muhammad Rafiq
Tazkara-e-Shuhada
Juratoan Kay Nishan
Haq Nawaz Kiyani Shaheed Sitara-e-Jurat
Akram Shaheed Nishan-e-Haider
Dastan-e-Ilm-o-Amal Volume I
Dastan-e-Ilm-o-Amal Volume II
Chiragon ki Qataar
Shaheed-e-Siachin

Books in English
Character and Conduct of Quaid-e-Azam
Living with Leadership
Learning to Lead
In Search of Maturity
From School to College
From School to College
A lasting light House
Teacher Guide
In Search of Character
Character Building Exercise
Teacher Education Programme
Character Building and Public Speaking
Pakistan and Character Building

Recognition 
Saeed Rashid Block: A new academic block was named after him at Military College Jhelum on 19 November 2000.

See also 
Muhammad Rafiq (brigadier)

References

External links
, Military College Jhelum site
, Military College Jhelum site
Professor Saeed Rashid's Book Ilm-o-Amal, Alamgirian.org – The MCJ Website
Renowned educationist passes away, PakSearch

Aligarh Muslim University alumni
Pakistani educational theorists
20th-century Pakistani historians
Pakistani schoolteachers
Recipients of the Pride of Performance
1927 births
People from Bareilly
1999 deaths
Saeed